In the Vanguard is a live album by vibraphonist Bobby Hutcherson featuring performances recorded in late 1986 at the Village Vanguard and released the following year on Orrin Keepnews' Landmark label.

Reception

On Allmusic, Scott Yanow observed "Vibraphonist Bobby Hutcherson was once associated with the avant-garde to a certain extent but by the 1970s it was clear he had found his voice in the modern mainstream of jazz. ... the results are high-quality modern bebop. The communication between the players is quite impressive".

Track listing
 "Little Niles" (Randy Weston) – 6:44
 "Estaté" (Bruno Martino, Bruno Brighetti) – 7:56
 "Well, You Needn't" (Thelonious Monk) – 7:32
 "Young and Foolish" (Albert Hague, Arnold B. Horwitt) – 10:23
 "Someday My Prince Will Come" (Frank Churchill, Larry Morey) – 10:02
 "Witchcraft" (Cy Coleman, Carolyn Leigh) – 7:44
 "I Wanna Stand Over There" (Bobby Hutcherson) – 5:06

Personnel
Bobby Hutcherson – vibraphone, marimba
Kenny Barron - piano
Buster Williams – bass
Al Foster – drums

References

Landmark Records live albums
Bobby Hutcherson live albums
1987 live albums
Albums produced by Orrin Keepnews
Albums recorded at the Village Vanguard